Agnetha & Frida: The Voice of ABBA is a compilation album of songs by singers Agnetha Fältskog and Anni-Frid Lyngstad (Frida), former members of the Swedish pop group ABBA, released in 1994. The compilation features a total of 14 tracks, seven from each singer.

Reception

William Ruhlmann of AllMusic commented that "ABBA fans will recognize Faltskog's sweet voice and Frida's slightly edgier one, of course, but that's as much of the sound of ABBA as they will hear. The two singers each tried to meet the early-'80s pop/rock marketplace, with its reliance on synthesizers and stop-start dance rhythms, rather than copying the homogenized, neo-'60s pop of ABBA. Just as they had with ABBA writer-producers Benny Andersson and Björn Ulvaeus, they served as mouthpieces for whomever they were working with, whether [Phil] Collins or someone else."

Track listing

References

1994 compilation albums
Agnetha Fältskog albums
Anni-Frid Lyngstad albums